María Teresa Kumar (née María Teresa Petersen; 1974) is a Colombian American political rights activist and President and CEO of the Latino political organization, Voto Latino. Kumar was named by Elle Magazine in 2013 as one of the ten most influential women in Washington, D.C. and by Hispanic Business in 2017 as one of the 100 most influential Latinos in America.

Early life and education 
Maria Teresa (Petersen) Kumar was born in Bogotá, Colombia in 1974, but grew up in Sonoma, California. Kumar spent her summers in Colombia when she was young.

Kumar attended the University of California, Davis where she received a BA in International Relations. She obtained a Master's degree in Public Policy from the John F. Kennedy School of Government at Harvard University.

Career 
Kumar began her career as a legislative aide to Democratic congressman Vic Fazio. She later attended the John F. Kennedy School of Government at Harvard University, where she recognized the importance of technology in improving the gap in equality in Latino lives. She began working with  the Latino advocacy group, Voto Latino in 2004. Currently based in Washington DC, the organization uses marketing campaigns and technology to encourage Latinos to participate in the political process.

In the beginning, Voto Latino's mission was to increase voter registration among Latinos in the U.S. Later, Voto Latino partnered with the U.S. Census Bureau to increase participation in the 2010 United States census. "To spread the word, Voto Latino and MTV’s Latino channel Tr3s aired public service announcements, created a hashtag on Twitter and established a nationwide network of bloggers". Kumar and her team also  launched the 'Be Counted' campaign, which included a bilingual mobile phone app which enabled Latinos to fill out the 2010 census on their phones. The organization is also currently assisting Latinos in navigating the health exchanges associated with the Affordable Care Act.

Under Kumar's direction, Voto Latino played a primary role in registering over half a million new Latino voters. In June, 2018, the organization announced that it has set a new goal of registering one million voters by 2020 and is planning to spend $7 million on the project.

As a guest host on MSNBC, Kumar argued on November 20, 2022, that gerrymandering was a factor in Gov. Ron DeSantis’ re-election, despite his race being a statewide office.

Awards and recognition
In 2010, Kumar was the recipient of an Emmy nomination in the Outstanding News Discussion and Analysis category for her role as co-creator and host of  the two hour MSNBC television special, Beyond Borderlines. It was the first televised English-speaking town hall which focused on Latino issues in the United States and the emerging role of Latinos in politics.

Kumar was named by Elle Magazine in 2013 as one of the ten most influential women in Washington D.C. In 2017, Kumar was named by Hispanic Business among the 100 most influential Latinos in America.

She was named a National Women's History Alliance Honoree in 2020.

References

External links

American democracy activists
Activists for Hispanic and Latino American civil rights
Activists from the San Francisco Bay Area
University of California, Davis alumni
Harvard University alumni
People from Sonoma, California
1974 births
Living people
MSNBC people